Michael Patrick Murphy (May 7, 1976 – June 28, 2005) was a United States Navy SEAL officer who was awarded the U.S. military's highest decoration, the Medal of Honor, for his actions during the War in Afghanistan. He was the first member of the United States Navy to receive the award since the Vietnam War. His other posthumous awards include the Silver Star Medal and the Purple Heart.

Michael Murphy was born and raised in Suffolk County, New York. He graduated from Pennsylvania State University with honors and dual degrees in political science and psychology. After college he accepted a commission in the United States Navy and became a United States Navy SEAL in July 2002. After participating in several War on Terrorism missions, he was killed on June 28, 2005, after his team was compromised and surrounded by Taliban forces near Asadabad, Afghanistan.

The U.S. Navy ship  and several civilian and military buildings have been named in his honor.

Early life and education
Murphy was born on May 7, 1976 in Smithtown, New York to Irish American parents Maureen and Daniel Murphy, a former assistant Suffolk County district attorney and a wounded veteran of the Vietnam War. He was raised in Patchogue, New York. He attended Saxton Middle School, where he played youth soccer and pee-wee football, with his father serving as his coach. In high school, he continued playing sports, and took a summer job as a lifeguard at the Brookhaven town beach in Lake Ronkonkoma, New York. He returned to the job every summer throughout his college years.

Murphy was known to his friends as "Murph" and as "The Protector" in his high school years. In 8th grade, he protected a child with special needs who was being shoved into a locker by a group of boys, ending with Murphy physically pulling the attackers away from the child. This was the only time the school principal had to notify Murphy's parents of a 'disciplinary' issue; his parents later reported that they "couldn't have been prouder". He also protected a homeless man who was being attacked while collecting cans. He chased away the attackers and helped the man pick up his cans.

In 1994, Murphy graduated from Patchogue-Medford High School and left to attend The Pennsylvania State University (Penn State). He graduated in 1998 with a double major in political science and psychology.  Murphy was engaged to his college sweetheart, Heather Duggan, and their wedding was scheduled for November 2005.

Career

After graduating from Penn State, Murphy applied and was accepted to several law schools, but decided to attend SEAL mentoring sessions at the United States Merchant Marine Academy. In September 2000, he accepted an appointment to the U.S. Navy's Officer Candidate School in Pensacola, Florida. On December 13 of that year, he was commissioned as an Ensign in the Navy and began Basic Underwater Demolition/SEAL (BUD/S) training in Coronado, California in January 2001, eventually graduating with Class 236 in November 2001.

Upon graduation from BUD/S, he attended the United States Army Airborne School, SEAL Qualification Training, and SEAL Delivery Vehicle (SDV) school. Murphy earned his SEAL Trident and checked on board SDV Team ONE (SDVT-1) in Pearl Harbor, Hawaii in July 2002. In October 2002, he deployed with Foxtrot Platoon to Jordan as the liaison officer for Exercise Early Victor. Following his tour with SDVT-1, Murphy was assigned to Special Operations Command Central (SOCCENT) in Florida and deployed to Qatar in support of Operation Iraqi Freedom. After returning from Qatar, he was deployed to Djibouti to assist in the operational planning of future SDV missions.

Combat in Afghanistan
In early 2005, Murphy was assigned to SEAL Delivery Vehicle Team ONE as officer in charge of Alpha Platoon and deployed to Afghanistan in support of Operation Enduring Freedom. While deployed, Murphy was known for wearing the patch of FDNY Engine Co. 53, Ladder Co. 43 ("El Barrio's Finest") in remembrance of the terrorist attacks on September 11th and an FDNY friend of his who had died that day. Shortly before deploying to Afghanistan, Murphy had asked for several patches from a close friend of his who had been assigned to the station.

Operation Red Wings

Operation Red Wings was a counter-insurgent mission in Kunar province, Afghanistan, involving a four man special reconnaissance team of United States Navy SEALs. Murphy and two other SEALs in the team, Danny Dietz and Matthew Axelson, were killed in the fighting, in addition to 16 other U.S. special operations members, who were killed when their helicopter was shot down while attempting to extract the SEAL recon team. Prior to a helicopter being shot down in 2011, Operation Red Wings was both the largest loss of life for U.S. forces in Afghanistan since the invasion began and the largest loss for the SEALs since the Vietnam War.

Murphy was the commander of the four-man reconnaissance team made up of himself, Danny Dietz, Matthew Axelson, and Marcus Luttrell. The team was tasked with conducting surveillance on a top Taliban leader, Ahmad Shah (code name Ben Sharmak), who commanded a group of insurgents known as the "Mountain Tigers," west of  Asadabad. They were dropped off by helicopter in a remote, mountainous area east of Asadabad in Kunar Province, near the Pakistan border. After an initially successful infiltration, local goat herders stumbled upon the SEALs' location. Unable to verify any hostile intent from the herders, the team cut them loose. Hostile locals, possibly the goat herders they released, alerted nearby Taliban forces, who surrounded and attacked the small team. At the cost of his own life, Murphy was able to get a message out to friendly forces of their situation, which prompted reinforcements flown in on an MH-47 Chinook helicopter. The helicopter was shot down by an RPG, killing all 16 personnel aboard; eight were SEALs, the other eight were 160th SOAR.

Murphy, Dietz, and Axelson were killed in the action. Luttrell was the only U.S. survivor and was eventually rescued, after having wandered in the mountains before being taken in by friendly local Afghan villagers. All three of Murphy's men were awarded the Navy's second-highest honor, the Navy Cross, for their part in the battle; alongside Murphy's Medal of Honor, their team became the most decorated in Navy SEAL history.

As a consequence of this, the US Military no longer allows for just 4 men in operations like this, it is now standard to have 8+ men in such an operation.

Death

Murphy was killed on 28 June 2005 during Operation Red Wings. He had left cover and moved to a clearing away from the mountains, exposing himself to a hail of gunfire in order to get a clear signal for his satellite phone so he could contact headquarters to relay their dire situation and request immediate support for his team. He dropped the satellite phone after being shot more than 14 times but picked the phone back up and finished the call. Murphy signed off saying "Thank you", then continued fighting from his exposed position until he died from his wounds.

On 4 July 2005, Murphy's remains were recovered by a group of American soldiers during a combat search and rescue operation and returned to the United States. On 13 July, Murphy was buried with full military honors at Calverton National Cemetery.

Awards and decorations

Medal of Honor
On 11 October 2007 the Bush administration announced Murphy would be presented the Medal of Honor, awarded posthumously, during a ceremony at the White House on 22 October  2007.

The Medal of Honor is the highest military decoration awarded by the United States government and is bestowed on a member of the armed forces who distinguishes himself "...conspicuously by gallantry and intrepidity at the risk of his life above and beyond the call of duty while engaged in an action against an enemy of the United States..." Due to the nature of the award, it is commonly presented posthumously.

President George W. Bush presented Murphy's Medal of Honor to his parents on 22 October 2007.

Citation

For conspicuous gallantry and intrepidity at the risk of his life and above and beyond the call of duty as the leader of a special reconnaissance element with Naval Special Warfare task unit Afghanistan on 27 and 28 June 2005.While leading a mission to locate a high-level anti-coalition militia leader, Lieutenant Murphy demonstrated extraordinary heroism in the face of grave danger in the vicinity of Asadabad, Kunar Province, Afghanistan.  On 28 June 2005, operating in an extremely rugged enemy-controlled area, Lieutenant Murphy's team was discovered by anti-coalition militia sympathizers, who revealed their position to Taliban fighters.  As a result, between 30 and 40 enemy fighters besieged his four member team.  Demonstrating exceptional resolve, Lieutenant Murphy valiantly led his men in engaging the large enemy force.  The ensuing fierce firefight resulted in numerous enemy casualties, as well as the wounding of all four members of the team.  Ignoring his own wounds and demonstrating exceptional composure, Lieutenant Murphy continued to lead and encourage his men.  When the primary communicator fell mortally wounded, Lieutenant Murphy repeatedly attempted to call for assistance for his beleaguered teammates.  Realizing the impossibility of communicating in the extreme terrain, and in the face of almost certain death, he fought his way into open terrain to gain a better position to transmit a call.  This deliberate, heroic act deprived him of cover, exposing him to direct enemy fire.  Finally achieving contact with his headquarters, Lieutenant Murphy maintained his exposed position while he provided his location and requested immediate support for his team.  In his final act of bravery, he continued to engage the enemy until he was mortally wounded, gallantly giving his life for his country and for the cause of freedom.  By his selfless leadership, Lieutenant Murphy reflected great credit upon himself and upheld the highest traditions of the United States Naval Service.

Legacy
During his military career, Murphy received 11 different military decorations, including the Medal of Honor, Purple Heart, Joint Service Commendation Medal, and Navy Commendation Medal.

In addition to the Medal of Honor, his military awards, and his inscription on the Hall of Heroes in the Pentagon,  Murphy has received several other honors.

Michael P. Murphy Memorial
The Penn State class of 2011's senior gift was a memorial named after Lt. Michael P. Murphy to commemorate all veterans who served the United States. The wall behind the memorial is inscribed with a Greek phrase meaning "With it [your shield], or on it" referencing the ancient Spartan tradition that a warrior came home from a battle "with his shield" after a victory, or dead being carried home "on his shield" after a defeat. A Greek warrior could not escape the field of battle unless he tossed away the heavy and cumbersome shield. Therefore, "losing one's shield" meant retreat.

Michael P. Murphy Memorial Park
On 7 May 2006, on what would have been his 30th birthday, Murphy's hometown dedicated the Michael P. Murphy Memorial Park; formerly Lake Ronkonkoma Park. The park contains a black granite wall dedicated to the men lost in Operation Red Wings, with each member's name inscribed. A black granite stone embedded in the plaza bears the picture of Murphy and his Medal of Honor.

The memorial was vandalized by a 14-year-old boy in 2018. Murphy's parents forgave the teen and stated that they did not believe "he understood the significance of what he had done".

Lieutenant Michael P. Murphy United States Post Office

On 7 May 2007, the Lieutenant Michael P. Murphy United States Post Office was dedicated in Patchogue, New York. The request to rename the historic United States Postal Office located at 170 East Main Street in Patchogue, New York, was submitted as bill H.R. 4101 to the 109th Congress. On 3 January 2006, the 109th Congress approved the request and on 1 August 2006, it was signed by President George W. Bush and became Public Law No: 109–256.

The facility of the United States Postal Service located at 170 East Main Street in Patchogue, New York, shall be known and designated as the 'Lieutenant Michael P. Murphy Post Office Building'."

USS Michael Murphy (DDG-112)

On 7 May 2008, Secretary of the Navy Donald C. Winter announced that DDG-112, the last planned U.S. Navy  at the time, would be named  in honor of Murphy. On 7 May 2011, on what would have been Murphy's 35th birthday, USS Michael Murphy was christened by his mother Maureen Murphy, the ship's sponsor.

Lt. Michael P. Murphy Combat Training Pool

On 9 July 2009, the newly constructed Combat Training Pool at the Naval Station Newport, Rhode Island was dedicated in honor of Murphy.  The pool is an L-shaped, 8-lane pool which holds approximately 347,000 gallons of chlorinated water. The training pool is used primarily by Officer Training Command, Newport for swim qualifications and training. It also has a training platform three meters above the water which is used for military training, abandon ship drills, etc.

Lt. Michael P. Murphy Award in Geospatial Intelligence
The Lt. Michael P. Murphy Award in Geospatial Intelligence recognizes achievement by a Penn State graduate student who is serving or has served in the U.S. Armed Forces or with the U.S. Intelligence Community and demonstrated exceptional contributions to the discipline. The award was made possible by the gifts of GeoEye and the US Geospatial Intelligence Foundation. This award is endowed to be given in Murphy's name in perpetuity.

Lt. Michael P. Murphy/Penn State Veterans Plaza
On 2 November 2010, it was announced the senior gift for the Pennsylvania State University (Murphy's alma mater) Class of 2011 will be the Lt. Michael P. Murphy/Penn State Veterans Plaza. The plaza will honor all Penn State veterans and Murphy, Penn State's only Medal of Honor recipient.

Long Island Medal of Honor Recipients Memorial Plaque
The United States Veterans Hospital at Northport Long Island New York maintains a memorial plaque that names all of the Medal of Honor recipients who have lived on Long Island. Lt. Murphy's name was placed in honor on this memorial shortly after he was awarded the Medal of Honor. Others honored include President Theodore Roosevelt, General Theodore Roosevelt, Jr., and Murphy's fellow Eastern Long Island hero Garfield Langhorn. The Memorial, which is at the back end of the hospital lobby, is in close proximity to where his mother works in the hospital.

High school campus
In April 2014, Patchogue-Medford High School in Medford, New York, named its campus the "Navy (SEAL) Lt. Michael P. Murphy Campus" after its fallen former pupil.

Sea Cadet unit
The Sea Cadet unit from West Sayville, New York is named the "Lt. Michael P. Murphy Division" and has hosted and sponsored events in honor of Murphy.

Fort Hamilton MEPS Memorial Wall
The Fort Hamilton MEPS has named the room where new recruits from all branches take the oath of service after Murphy. Inside of which is a memorial wall dedicated to Murphy.

Lt. Michael P Murphy Distinguished Citizen Award
The Central Pennsylvania council of the Navy League of the United States awards the "Lt. Michael P Murphy Distinguished Citizen Award" in his name. The award honors living, non-active duty citizens who exemplify his character and commitment to his country and his community.

FDNY Engine Co. 53, Ladder Co. 43 station 

While deployed, Murphy had worn the patch of FDNY Engine Co. 53, Ladder Co. 43 on his fatigues in remembrance of 9/11 and the firefighters lost that day. Honored by this action and his sacrifice, the station sent 3 formal representatives to his Medal of Honor ceremony. After his death, several of his SEAL colleagues had visited the station and given them a memorial plaque in Murphy's name. Since then, the station has had a special connection with the SEALs; service members on leave in the area are welcomed to stay with the station overnight, including those of other branches of the military. A captain of the station at the time stated "it's our way of showing these guys that we appreciate what they do. Our firehouse is their home".

Murph workout
Murphy created his own CrossFit-style workout called "Body Armor", which involved running, pushing, pulling, and lifting exercises while wearing body armor, a  vest that he wore while deployed. After Murphy's death, the Body Armor workout began to become popular among SEAL teams everywhere as it could be done almost anywhere and required very little equipment. On August 17, 2005, Greg Glassman, the founder of CrossFit, posted the workout to CrossFit's website as the Workout of the Day (WOD). Now the workout is often performed at CrossFit affiliates, military bases, and Navy ships around the world on Memorial Day.

LT MICHAEL P. MURPHY NAVY SEAL MUSEUM

The LT Michael P. Murphy Navy SEAL Museum/Sea Cadet Training Facility is a dual purpose building located in West Sayville NY with a Museum dedicated to telling the history, legacy and sacrifices of Naval Special Warfare operators from WW II and the underwater demolition teams through the present day War on Terror with 7 Exhibition Halls, a theater and SEAL Adventure Ride. The building also houses a Sea Cadet Training Facility which is the home of the LT Michael P. Murphy Sea Cadet Division of the United States Naval Sea Cadets.

In media
In the 2013 film Lone Survivor, Murphy is portrayed by actor Taylor Kitsch.

Murph: The Protector is a 2013 documentary about Murphy as told by his family and friends.

See also

List of post-Vietnam War Medal of Honor recipients

Notes

References

Further reading

External links

 MEDAL OF HONOR RECIPIENT MICHAEL P MURPHY Archived
 LT Michael P. Murphy Memorial Scholarship Foundation Archived
 USS Michael Murphy Archived

1976 births
2005 deaths
American military personnel killed in the War in Afghanistan (2001–2021)
American people of Irish descent
Burials at Calverton National Cemetery
Military personnel from New York (state)
People from Patchogue, New York
People from Smithtown, New York
Pennsylvania State University alumni
Recipients of the Silver Star
United States Navy officers
United States Navy SEALs personnel
United States Navy Medal of Honor recipients
War in Afghanistan (2001–2021) recipients of the Medal of Honor
United States Navy personnel of the War in Afghanistan (2001–2021)